Tapestry Technologies is a small privately owned systems integration defense contractor based in Chambersburg, Pennsylvania. The company provides professional services to the United States Department of Defense, United States Navy, and the U.S. Army Information Technology Agency in the areas of cybersecurity, network and systems engineering, training, and IT support.

History

Tapestry Technologies was founded in 2005 by Jacquie Sipes, Jim Govekar, and Cindy Whitmer with Sipes serving as the company’s CEO. Since its inception the company has focused on performing defense contract work under the category of woman-owned small business.  It was recognized by Fortune Magazine as one of the Top 20 Great Workplaces in Technology for 2014  and listed on the Inc. 5000 as one of the fastest growing private companies in the United States. At the start of 2015, Tapestry had $10 million in revenue and a three-year sales growth of 217%.  By May 2015, the company had 73 employees occupying about 20,000 square feet of office space.

Services

Since October 2013, Tapestry Technologies has served as a prime contractor on the GSA Schedule 70 contract GS-35F-007BA.  The company has also performed work as a sub-contractor on the ENCORE II, Veterans Administration Transformation Twenty-One Total Technology (VA-T4), and GSM-ETI contract vehicles.

Tapestry centers its business on a niche market within the Defense Information Systems Agency providing information assurance and cyber security services including: certification and accreditation, security readiness reviews (SSR), security technical implementation guides (STIG), and technical training.  The company's main areas of expertise are cyber defense, cyber training, cyber integration, and IT help desk services.  Through these areas of expertise, Tapestry has performed work on various government task orders including writing “the security policy for a consolidated email system used by about 4.6 million DOD users and other clients.”

References

External links
Official Website

Chambersburg, Pennsylvania
Technology companies established in 2005
Privately held companies based in Pennsylvania
Computer security companies
American companies established in 2005